Pribelsky is a rural locality (a selo) and the administrative centre of Pribelsky Selsoviet, Karmaskalinsky District, Bashkortostan, Russia. The population was 4,859 as of 2010. There are 56 streets.

Geography 
Pribelsky is located 26 km east of Karmaskaly (the district's administrative centre) by road. Sart-Chishma is the nearest rural locality.

References 

Rural localities in Karmaskalinsky District